Nathan Polk Morton (September 25, 1948 – November 30, 2005) is best known as a pioneer of the "big-box" retail method.

Born in Washington, D.C. to Robert and Natalie Morton, his elementary and junior high school years were  spent in the Town of Tonawanda, a northern suburb bordering Buffalo, New York. His family moved to Chicago shortly after he started high school. He attended the State University of New York at Buffalo, where he majored in Drama, graduating in 1970. He would later earn an M.B.A. from the University of Buffalo. His career in retail began with Two Guys, and he later moved to Target Corporation, where he was instrumental in that chain's expansion to the West Coast.

He later became Executive VP of operations with Home Depot, expanding its stores across the nation, and is listed in "The Book" about Home Depot's founding and meteoric expansion. He was later recruited to join Soft Warehouse Inc. as its chief operating officer and CEO in 1988, oversaw changing the company's name to CompUSA and taking it public in 1991. He resigned as the company's chairman and CEO in December 1993. Morton was also a co-founder and twice served as President of CompTIA, the Association of Computer and Software developers and resellers.

At the time of his death from pneumonia in Frisco, Texas, he was chairman and CEO of Central Lighting Co. based in Irvine, CA, Chairman of the Board at American Homestar Corp. in Houston, Texas, and Chairman of the Board of Starpower Home Entertainment Stores of Dallas, Texas. He is survived by his widow, Patti Morton, four sons, Jason, Ryan, Logan, and Chase Morton, step-daughter, Amy Richardson, and step-grandson, Grant Richardson. 

Big-box store is a term of art in the retail trade that refers to a style of retail store, and by extension to the company behind the store. The terms superstore, megastore, and supercenter also refer to these retail establishments.

American businesspeople in retailing
1948 births
2005 deaths